Samson Godwin (born 11 November 1983) is a former Nigerian football midfielder.

Career 
Godwin started his football career in a Nigerian first division club Gabros F.C. at the age of 17, after playing for a season in Nigeria, young footballer was noticed by scouts from Poland, and the following season, in 2000 Godwin moved to Europe, playing for Polish club Marbet Ceramed Bielsko-Biała. After one season at Marbet, Godwin moved to another Polish club GKS Katowice. However, not finding much success there in spring of 2002, Samson Godwin moved to Ukrainian club Karpaty Lviv, where he has remained since. He is a regular for the club and has played over 100 games (98 League and 10 Cup competitions). He spent the first half of 2009 on loan to FC Shakhter Karagandy.

In 2006, while playing for Karpaty, Godwin was a candidate for a spot in Nigerian national Team, and then coach Augustine Eguavoen, visited the game Karpaty Lviv vs Dynamo Kyiv to witness the Godwin's game and see the progress of Dynamo's Nigerian midfielder Ayila Yussuf.

Personal life 

Godwin claims that after his football career comes to an end he would prefer to stay in Ukraine and become a businessman.

His best friend off the pitch is a former Karpaty player, and a current striker for another Ukrainian club FC Kharkiv, William Batista. He is also friends with Nigerian footballer Lucky Idahor, who has formerly performed for Karpaty, and is currently playing for Tavriya Simferopol. Godwin's favourite footballers are Zinedine Zidane and Claude Makélélé.

References

External links 
Profile on the Official Website of Karpaty Lviv 

1983 births
Living people
Sportspeople from Warri
Nigerian footballers
Association football midfielders
Nigerian expatriate footballers
Expatriate footballers in Poland
Expatriate footballers in Ukraine
Nigerian expatriate sportspeople in Ukraine
Expatriate footballers in Kazakhstan
Expatriate footballers in Belarus
Nigerian expatriate sportspeople in Poland
Ukrainian Premier League players
Ukrainian First League players
Ukrainian Second League players
Ifeanyi Ubah F.C. players
Podbeskidzie Bielsko-Biała players
GKS Katowice players
FC Karpaty Lviv players
FC Shakhter Karagandy players
FC Volyn Lutsk players
FC Minsk players
FC Slavia Mozyr players